Viroporins are small and usually hydrophobic multifunctional viral proteins that modify cellular membranes, thereby facilitating virus release from infected cells. Viroporins are capable of assembling into oligomeric ion channels or pores in the host cell's membrane, rendering it more permeable and thus facilitating the exit of virions from the cell. Many viroporins also have additional effects on cellular metabolism and homeostasis mediated by protein-protein interactions with host cell proteins. Viroporins are not necessarily essential for viral replication, but do enhance growth rates. They are found in a variety of viral genomes but are particularly common in RNA viruses. Many viruses that cause human disease express viroporins. These viruses include hepatitis C virus, HIV-1, influenza A virus, poliovirus, respiratory syncytial virus, and SARS-CoV.

Structure 
Viroporins are usually small - under 100 or 120 amino acid residues - and contain at least one region capable of folding into an amphipathic transmembrane helix. Some examples also contain stretches of basic amino acids, or stretches of aromatic amino acids thought to reside in the interfacial region of the membrane. Oligomers of these proteins, most often tetramers, form ion channels or pores of usually weak ion selectivity that permit diffusion of ions across the cell membrane. The molecular architecture of the pore, its degree of selectivity, the extent to which it incorporates lipids from the surrounding membrane, and the presence of portions of the protein that extend beyond the membrane all vary among viroporins and indicate that these proteins have a diverse array of functional roles.

Classification
A proposed classification scheme sorts viroporins into four classes based on their topology and orientation in the membrane. Class I viroporins possess a single transmembrane helix; in class IA the C-terminus is oriented into the cytosol and in class IB the N-terminus is so oriented. Class II viroporins possess a helix-turn-helix motif with both helices crossing the membrane; in class IIA both termini are oriented externally (extracellularly or toward the lumen of the endoplasmic reticulum) and in class IIB the termini are oriented toward the cytosol. Likely exceptions to this scheme exist, such as the rotavirus protein non-structural protein 4.

Function

Essentiality
Most viroporins are not essential, but their absence significantly reduces the efficiency of viral propagation. There is significant variation in the consequences of viroporin depletion: while hepatitis C virus is incapable of propagation without its p7 protein viroporin, influenza A virus and HIV-1 see decreases in in vitro viral titer of 10- to 100-fold in the absence of their respective viroporins, but remain capable of propagation. In most cases absence of viroporin in the viral genome can be rescued by the presence of viroporin in trans, and sometimes viral replication can be partially rescued in the presence of another virus' viroporin.

Membrane permeabilization
The most well-studied and well-established function of viroporins is the permeabilization of the cell membrane to ions and small solutes. Before viroporins themselves were understood as a class, it was well known that many viruses induce membrane permeabilization in infected cells; viroporins are at least partially responsible for this effect, particularly when it occurs late in the viral replication cycle. Viroporins expressed transgenically, in the absence of their virus of origin, induce the same effect, a feature that has facilitated viroporin discovery.

In most cases, pores formed by viroporins are nonselective or only weakly selective for particular ions or small molecules. However, some examples do show strong selectivity; examples include the influenza A virus M2 proton channel protein, which is highly selective for protons and is active at low pH, and the Chlorella virus Kcv protein, which is selective for potassium ions. An alternative mechanism is illustrated by the SARS-CoV E protein, which forms a pore that integrates membrane lipids whose polar head groups influence ion selectivity. The homologous E protein of SARS-CoV-2 has been structurally characterized by solid-state NMR and found to form a pentamer permeable to cations.

Loss of membrane polarization can promote viral yields through a variety of mechanisms that operate throughout the viral life cycle. In enveloped viruses, viroporins are not highly concentrated in the viral envelope, but nevertheless their presence may promote viral entry into the cell; the influenza A virus provides a well-studied example. Viroporins in the membranes of organelles such as the Golgi apparatus can influence those organelles' internal environments, which can modulate protein trafficking of viral proteins or protect the proteins from the low pH they would otherwise encounter in these cellular compartments. In non-enveloped viruses, the membrane permeability changes may be sufficient to induce cell lysis, thereby permitting the new virions to exit the cell. In enveloped viruses, viroporins' depolarization effect is thought to promote viral budding. Abrogating the ion channel or pore function of viroporins, either through mutations that block conductance without disrupting other functions or through channel-blocking drugs, usually reduces or eliminates viral propagation.

Genome replication
Most viruses encoding viroporins can replicate their genomes in the absence of the viroporin, even if they are impaired in propagation. Rotaviruses and picornaviruses, however, rely on their viroporins to facilitate the formation of viroplasm, or specialized intracellular compartments remodeled from the membrane of the endoplasmic reticulum in which genome replication occurs.

Protein-protein interactions
Some viroporins have established functional effects exerted through protein-protein interactions. For example, the HIV-1 viroporin Vpu promotes viral budding through interactions with CD4 and tetherin, though the precise molecular mechanism of this interaction is not known. The JC polyomavirus agnoprotein functions as a viroporin in addition to other roles mediated through interactions with viral proteins such as major capsid protein VP1.

Role in disease

Virulence factors
Viroporins can also be considered virulence factors; in viruses in which viroporins are not essential, their pathogenicity is attenuated in the absence of viroporin beyond the level expected by the effects on viral propagation. In some cases the membrane permeabilization effects of viroporins activate the inflammasome, a protein complex associated with activation of innate immunity which, when overactive, can cause disease symptoms.

Oncoproteins
The human papillomavirus 16 E5 protein, the least well-studied of the three known oncogenic HPV proteins, was reported in 2012 to be a viroporin. This was the first known example of an oncogenic viroporin.

Drug targets
Because some viroporins are essential for viral propagation, they are often considered to be appealing drug targets for development of antiviral drugs. Although many chemical compounds have been reported to interfere with the ion channel functions of various viroporins, clinical usage is relatively rare. Amantadine, which was discovered in the 1960s and has been in clinical use against influenza A for some time, is an example of a viroporin-targeting drug; however, a 2014 Cochrane review did not find benefit for its use in children or elderly people and the US CDC does not recommend drugs of this class due to widespread resistance mutations.

Examples
Viroporins can be found in a large number of viruses with distinct genomic organizations and replication mechanisms.

This table represents a composite of Table 1 from Gonzalez et al. 2003, Table 1 from Wang et al. 2011, and Table 1, Box 1, and Box 2 from Nieva et al. 2012.

See also
Holins, small pore-forming transmembrane proteins produced by dsDNA bacteriophages

References

External links

Links to Viroporin families in TCDB database

Viral protein class
Protein families